Jolanda di Maria Petris (1916—1987) was an Italian-Finnish operatic soprano and voice pedagog.

She won several singing competitions, and toured extensively in Europe and the Americas, including with many notable singers such as Beniamino Gigli, Jussi Björling and Giuseppe De Luca.

After World War II, di Maria Petris got divorced and moved to Finland, where she made a career as a voice teacher; among her many students is Jaakko Ryhänen, who credits her as his most influential tutor. She was appointed as a singing instructor at the Sibelius Academy in 1960. She also judged several international singing competitions from the late 1950s until the mid-1970s.

References

Italian sopranos
Academic staff of Sibelius Academy
People from Pula
1916 births
1987 deaths
Italian emigrants to Finland